Nice is a studio album by the American rock band Rollins Band, released in 2001. It was their first album released on Sanctuary Records. It was the Rollins Band's final studio album.

The band line-up was Henry Rollins fronting the blues rock band Mother Superior, whilst retaining the Rollins Band name.

Production
During the making of the album, Rollins was often flying in and out of Vancouver, Canada to record parts for Fox's horror anthology show Night Visions, which he was the host of.

Critical reception
Spin deemed the album "lukewarm metal oatmeal with funk raisins." The Cleveland Scene called it "looser, calmer, and more varied in its sonic attack." The Hartford Courant wrote that "songs occasionally drift off into quiet blues-guitar passages, but they're inevitably interrupted by Rollins' brutish bellow, which often feels out of place." CMJ New Music Monthly wrote that "it may not be a full return to relevance, but Nice does serve notice that Hank still, somehow, rules." In February 2002, Pitchforks Dominique Leone gave the album a negative review, awarding it only a 3 out of 10. He wrote, "Henry Rollins' latest release, Nice, is utterly irrelevant in the context of almost every other album reviewed at Pitchfork. It's too macho to be indie, too rock to be punk, too 'in your face, to tha X-treme' to be current, too Guitar Center to be Amoeba. It is certainly too Rollins to be subtle or multi-dimensional." Louder Sound ranked it as the worst Rollins Band album in 2022.

Track listing
"One Shot" – 3:03
"Up for It" – 4:39
"Gone Inside the Zero" – 2:39
"Hello" – 3:04
"What's the Matter Man" – 2:58
"Your Number Is One" – 4:27
"Stop Look and Listen" – 1:48
"I Want So Much More" – 3:42
"Hangin' Around" – 5:25
"Going Out Strange" – 4:51
"We Walk Alone" – 3:59
"Let That Devil Out" – 4:21Bonus tracks'
"Nowhere to Go but Inside" – 3:02
"Too Much Rock and Roll" – 3:49
Australian edition
"Soul Implant" – 4:57
"Marcus Has Evil in Him – 4:00

Personnel
Rollins Band
Henry Rollins – vocals
Jim Wilson – guitar
Marcus Blake – bass guitar
Jason Mackenroth – drums, saxophone
with:
Clif Norrell – trumpet
Jackie Simley-Stevens, Valerie Pinkston, Maxayn Lewis, Sueann Carwell, Tyler Collins – backing vocals on "Up for It" and "I Want So Much More"

''Technical'''
Recorded at Cherokee Studios, Los Angeles, California
Produced by Henry Rollins
Engineered by Clif Norrell

Charts

References

External links
Mother Superior discography

Rollins Band albums
2001 albums
Sanctuary Records albums